Pepsin is an unincorporated community in Newton County, in the U.S. state of Missouri.

History
A post office called Pepsin was established in 1892, and remained in operation until 1903. It is unknown why the name "Pepsin" was applied to this community.

References

Unincorporated communities in Newton County, Missouri
Unincorporated communities in Missouri